The 1953 Carrera Panamericana was the fourth running of the Carrera Panamericana Mexican sports car racing event, and the first edition as a part of the World Sportscar Championship.

Pre-race
For the 1953 race, the existing Sports and Stock classes were both subdivided into Large and Small groups, giving four categories in which to compete. These were split by engine capacity; sports cars were divided under and over 1600 cc (98 ci), and stock cars under and over 3500 cc (213.5 ci). This was to accommodate the huge number of participants and the diverse breeds of cars within the race.

Going into the race, Ferrari had a slender championship lead of just two points over Jaguar. Although neither manufacturer had sent work entries to Mexico, the title could still be snatched by the Coventry marque, despite the Italian marque having more cars in the event.

Race

Both Lancia and Lincoln came to the race highly organized and both factories swept 1–2–3 finishes in their respective categories. The Europeans dominated the sports categories, and the Americans the stock. Large Sports Cars was won by Juan Manuel Fangio of Argentina and Gino Bronzoni of Italy in a Lancia D24 Pinin Farina, Small Sports Cars by José Herrarte Ariano and Carlos González from Guatemala in a Porsche 550 Coupé. Large Stock Cars was won by Chuck Stevenson and Clay Smith of the United States in a Lincoln Capri and Small Stock Cars by C.D. Evans and Walter Krause, Jr., also of the U.S., in a six-cylinder Chevrolet 210. Stevenson has the distinction of being the only person to ever win twice in the original race.

The race was marred by the death of a number of competitors. The co-driver and pacenote systems championed by the Mercedes-Benz teams of the previous year were vindicated by the failure of an alternative system used by some other works drivers, notably those of Lancia. During pre-race runs of the route at much safer speeds, Felice Bonetto and Piero Taruffi, winner of the 1951 edition of the race, painted warning signals on the road to remind themselves of particular hazards. This resulted in the death of Bonetto who, leading the race under pressure from Taruffi, missed his own warning signs. Entering the village of Silao, he encountered rough pavement at excessive speed and impacted a building, killing him instantly.

As a result of Guido Mancini and Fabrizio Serena di Lapigio finishing in fourth place, in their Ferrari 375 MM Pinin Farina Berlinetta, they secured three points for Ferrari, thereby increasing the Maranello marque points lead over Jaguar, giving them the 1953 World Championship for Manufacturer title.

The race was held over eight stages over a total distance of 1,912 miles. Fangio and Bronzoni won in their works-entered Lancia D24 Pinin Farina.  The pair finished the race in 18 hours and 11 minutes, averaging . Second place went to their teammates, Piero Taruffi and Luigi Maggio, in their D24, just 7:51 minutes behind. The podium was complete by another of the Scuderia Lancia cars that of Eugenio Castellotti, with his co-driver, Carlo Luoni, in their Lancia D23, over 6:01 minutes adrift.

Official Classification

Class Winners are in Bold text.

Class Winners

Standings after the race

Note: Only the top five positions are included in this set of standings. Championship points were awarded for the first six places in each race in the order of 8-6-4-3-2-1. Manufacturers were only awarded points for their highest finishing car with no points awarded for positions filled by additional cars. Only the best 4 results out of the 7 races could be retained by each manufacturer. Points earned but not counted towards the championship totals are listed within brackets in the above table.

References

Further reading

John Pickworth. Carrera Panamericana. John Morton Pickworth. .
Daryl E. Murphy. Carrera Panamericana: History of the Mexican Prad Race, 1950-54. iUniverse, Inc.  
Johnny Tipler. La Carrera Panamericana: The World’s Greatest Road Race. Authors Online Ltd. 

Carrera Panamericana
Carrera Panamericana
Carrera Panamericana
November 1953 sports events in North America
November 1953 events in Mexico